Pingvin means "penguin" in several languages. It may refer to:

Pingvin Rocks, Antarctica
Pingvin Island, Antarctica
Pingvin exercise suit, Russian anti-zero-G suit
Pingvin RC, Swedish rugby club in Trelleborg
Pingvin, the name of Finnish gunboat Hämeenmaa when it was in Russian service